Floyd Eugene Dixon (born April 9, 1964) is a former professional American football wide receiver in the National Football League for seven seasons for the Atlanta Falcons and the Philadelphia Eagles.   He played college football at Stephen F. Austin State University and was drafted in the sixth round of the 1986 NFL Draft.

1964 births
Living people
People from Beaumont, Texas
American football wide receivers
Stephen F. Austin Lumberjacks football players
Atlanta Falcons players
Philadelphia Eagles players